Robert Church (born August 29, 1988) is a professional lacrosse player for the Saskatchewan Rush in the National Lacrosse League.

Early life
Church is the son of Nancy and Bruce Church. He grew up in Coquitlam, BC and began playing lacrosse when he was 11. He attended Dr. Charles Best Secondary School where he graduated with honors, was the B.C. High School MVP and played on the provincial championship team. After high school he transitioned into B.C. Intermediate A Lacrosse League and was named MVP in 2008 where he scored 106 points.

Junior career
Robert played his Jr A Lacrosse career for the Coquitlam Adanacs of the British Columbia Junior A Lacrosse League. He was the 2009 BCJALL Most Valuable Player leading the league with 107 points and was a First Team All-Star. He was named MVP of the 2010 Minto Cup. Church helped his Jr club reach three consecutive Minto Cups in 2010, 2011, and 2012.

College career
Church is a graduate from Drexel University. During his tenure there, he set the record for most goals scored in a game by a Drexel Dragon's player since 1996, scoring seven goals as a freshman against Hofstra in an upset victory. Church earned Rookie of the Week four times, as a result he was named to the NCAA’s All-Rookie Team.

Church finished fourth all time in Drexel scoring with 194 career points. As a senior, Church was selected a Division I honorable mention All American.

Church was named to the men's lacrosse program 75th Anniversary all-time team.

Professional career
Robert was the 5th overall draft pick, going to the Edmonton Rush in the 2013 NLL Entry Draft.  Named to the NLL's 2014 All-Rookie Team; finishing third in the NLL rookie scoring race with 52 goals and 31 assists. In 2017, he finished second in team scoring and 15th in the league during regular season, and in the playoffs finished second on the team and second in the league in scoring.  In the same year, Church scored 23 power-play goals to lead the NLL for a second consecutive season. Finished tied for 10th overall in league scoring with 92 points in 2015 and was third in the league with 14 power-play goals; tied with Rush teammate and former Coquitlam Adanacs Jr A teammate Ben McIntosh for 12th in the league with 37 goals. He has won 3 National Lacrosse League Championships in 2015, 2016, and 2018.

Church led the NLL in 2016 with 17 power-play goals and finished tied for 14th in league scoring with 86 points.

Statistics

NLL
Reference:

NCAA Statistics

Awards
2009 BC Jr A Lacrosse League MVP
2009 BC Jr A Lacrosse League Rookie of the Year 
2010 CAA All-Rookie Team
2010 Minto Cup Champion (Coquitlam Adanacs)
2010 Minto Cup MVP (Coquitlam Adanacs)
2014 Western Lacrosse Association MVP (Burnaby Lakers) 
2017 Western Lacrosse Association MVP (Burnaby Lakers) 
2019 Western Lacrosse Association MVP (Burnaby Lakers) 
2012 Second Team All-CAA (Drexel Dragons)
2013 First Team All-CAA (Drexel Dragons) 
2013 Honorable Mention All-American (Drexel Dragons)
2014 NLL All-Rookie Team
2015 NLL Champions Cup Winner (Edmonton Rush)
2016 NLL Champions Cup Winner (Saskatchewan Rush)
2018 1st Team NLL All-Pro
2018 NLL Cup Winner (Saskatchewan Rush)

See also
Drexel Dragons men's lacrosse

References

External links
Stats at NLL.com

1991 births
Living people
Canadian lacrosse players
Drexel Dragons men's lacrosse players
Edmonton Rush players
Lacrosse people from Ontario
National Lacrosse League major award winners
National Lacrosse League players
Saskatchewan Rush players